Fruitport Community Schools is a school district in Fruitport, Michigan, a village located in  Muskegon County. The superintendent of schools is Jason Kennedy.

Schools 
The schools are:
Fruitport High School
Fruitport Middle School
Beach Elementary School
Edgewood Elementary School
Shettler Elementary School
Early Childhood Center
Alternative High School
Adult Education

References

External links 
 

School districts in Michigan
Education in Muskegon County, Michigan